Arjen Visserman (born 20 August 1965) is a retired Dutch sprinter who specialised in the 400 metres. He represented his country at three World Indoor Championships.

International competitions

Personal bests
Outdoor
200 metres – 21.15 (Leiden 1987)
400 metres – 45.68 (Hengelo 1986) (ex-NR)
Indoor
200 metres – 21.79 (The Hague 1987)
400 metres – 46.73 (Indianapolis 1987) (ex-NR)

References

All-Athletics

1965 births
Living people
Dutch male sprinters
People from Wymbritseradiel
Sportspeople from Friesland